Gaspar Ignacio Vega (born 19 June 1992) is an Argentine professional footballer who plays as a midfielder for Mushuc Runa.

References

External links
 
 

1992 births
Living people
Argentine footballers
Argentine expatriate footballers
Association football midfielders
Club Atlético Belgrano footballers
Alumni de Villa María players
Club Atlético Las Palmas players
Sportivo Italiano footballers
Club Atlético Atlanta footballers
Rampla Juniors players
Persik Kediri players
Club Atlético Temperley footballers
Mushuc Runa S.C. footballers
Primera C Metropolitana players
Primera B Metropolitana players
Uruguayan Primera División players
Argentine expatriate sportspeople in Uruguay
Argentine expatriate sportspeople in Indonesia
Argentine expatriate sportspeople in Ecuador
Expatriate footballers in Uruguay
Expatriate footballers in Indonesia
Expatriate footballers in Ecuador
Footballers from Córdoba, Argentina